The northern expeditions of Shu can be justified by two differing scenarios:

 Zhuge Liang's Northern Expeditions; 228-234
 Jiang Wei's Northern Expeditions; 247-262